During butchering, beef is first divided into primal cuts, pieces of meat initially separated from the carcass. These are basic sections from which steaks and other subdivisions are cut. Since the animal's legs and neck muscles do the most work, they are the toughest; the meat becomes more tender as distance from hoof and horn increases. 

Different countries and cuisines have different cuts and names, and sometimes use the same name for a different cut; e.g., the cut described as brisket in the US is from a significantly different part of the carcass than British brisket. Cut often refers narrowly to skeletal muscle (sometimes attached to bones), but can also include other edible flesh, such as offal (organ meat) or bones without significant muscles attached.

American and Canadian

The following is a list of the American primal cuts, and cuts derived from them. Beef carcasses are split along the axis of symmetry into "halves", then across into front and back "quarters" (forequarters and hindquarters). Canada uses identical cut names (and numbering) as the U.S, with the exception of the "round" which is called the "hip".

Forequarter 
 The chuck is the source of bone-in chuck steaks and roasts (arm or blade), and boneless clod steaks and roasts, most commonly. The trimmings and some whole boneless chucks are ground for ground beef.
 The rib contains part of the short ribs, the prime rib and rib eye steaks.
 Brisket, primarily used for barbecue, corned beef or pastrami.
 The foreshank or shank is used primarily for stews and soups; it is not usually served any other way because it is the toughest of the cuts.
 The plate is the other source of short ribs, used for pot roasting, and the outside skirt steak, which is used for fajitas. The navel is the ventral part of the plate, and is commonly used to make pastrami. The remainder is usually ground, as it is typically a tough and fatty meat.

Hindquarter 
 The loin has two subprimals
 the short loin, from which the T-bone and porterhouse steaks are cut if bone-in, or strip steak.
 the sirloin, which is less tender than short loin, but more flavorful, can be further divided into top sirloin and bottom sirloin (including tri-tip), and
 the tenderloin, which is the most tender, can be removed as a separate subprimal, and cut into filet mignons, tournedos or tenderloin steaks, and roasts (such as for beef Wellington). They can also be cut bone-in to make parts of the T-bone and porterhouse loin steaks.
 The round contains lean, moderately tough, lower fat (less marbling) cuts, which require moist or rare cooking.  Some representative cuts are round steak, eye of round, top round, and bottom round steaks and roasts.
The flank is used mostly for grinding, except for the long and flat flank steak, best known for use in London broil, and the inside skirt steak, also used for fajitas. Flank steaks were once one of the most affordable steaks, because they are substantially tougher than the more desirable loin and rib steaks. Many modern recipes for flank steak use marinades or moist cooking methods, such as braising, to improve the tenderness and flavor. This, combined with a new interest in these cuts' natural leanness, has increased the price of the flank steak.

Argentine 
The most important cuts of beef in Argentine cuisine are:

   the large section of the rib cage including short ribs and spare ribs
   often translated as short ribs, but also sold as long, thin strips of ribs. Chuck ribs, flanken style (cross-cut).
   T-bone or porterhouse steaks
   strip steak, called NY strip in US 
   ribeye steak
   eye of the round
   upper portion of small intestines
   tri-tip, or the tail of the rump roast
   rump
   skirt steak
   navel
   tenderloin
   a long, thin cut that lies just under the skin and runs from the lower part of the ribs to belly–or flank area
   sweetbreads (thymus gland)
   brisket
   kidneys
   rib cap
   top of round roast
   flank, though it may contain the muscles of other near cuts

Brazilian 

The most important cuts of beef in Brazilian cuisine are:

    neck
    top/bottom sirloin 
    tenderloin 
   round (upper)
   round (lower)
    part of the tenderloin
    round (outer)
    bottom sirloin/flank
    confluence of flank, bottom sirloin and rear shank
 Picanha   rump cover or rump cap
   hump (zebu cattle only)
    confluence of short loin, flank and bottom sirloin
    chuck/brisket

British, Australian, South African and New Zealand

 Tongue
 
 
 
 
 
 
 Top rump
 
 Rib eye steak
 T-bone steak
 
 
  (Skirt steak)
 
 
 
 Feather blade
 Fillet
 Oxtail

Colombian 
  (top round)
  (heel)                            
  (bottom round)
 
  (bottom round)
  or 
 
  (sirloin)                         
  (tri-tip)
  (sirloin tip center)

Chinese

Dutch 

 Neck
 Rib steak
 Sirloin
 Tenderloin – considered to be the premium cut, highly prized. It is called  in Dutch. It tends to be cut slightly smaller than its American counterpart.
 Top sirloin
 Flank
 Chuck – the best cuts are used for stoofvlees; lesser bits are used in hachee.
 Brisket
 Shankle
 Beef tongue is considered the cheapest piece of beef; it is used in certain styles of sausages such as the frikandel, though not as the main ingredient.
 Oxtail, though not on the image shown, is used extensively in stews.

Finnish 
The cuts of beef in Finland are:

Entrecôte (rib eye)
 (chuck and blade)
 (topside)
 (flank/rib)
 (shoulder)
 (chuck)
 (bottom sirloin)
 (cheek)
 (shank)
 (brisket)
 (filet/tenderloin)
 (silverside/bottom round)
 (sirloin)
 (rump)

French

German 

  (short ribs)
  (brisket)
  or 
  (fillet)
  or 
 ,  and 
 ,  or 
 

Croatian  

 
 
 
 
 
 
 
 , 
 , 

Italian 

 Leg subcuts
 Codone
  (flank)
  (eye of the silverside)
  or girello
  or 
 Sirloin subcuts
 Filetto (beef tenderloin)
  or roast beef (sirloin)
 Veal Carré (spare ribs)
 
 
 Loin
  (T-bone steak)
  (short ribs)
 Neck
  (chuck steak)
  or 
 Head subcuts
 Lingua (beef tongue)
 Testina (flesh from the head of a calf)
 Shoulder subcuts
 
 Fusello or 
 
  or 
 Hocks subcuts
 anterior and posterior Ossibuchi
 
  (chest) subcuts
  (brisket)
  or 
 Lower ribs subcuts
  or 
  (Pony 6 ribs, square cut, chuck, middle rib, steak meat)
  (belly) subcuts
 
 Fiocco
  (armhole)

Korean 

 1. 
 
 2. 
 
 
 
 
 3. 
 
 4. 
 
 
 5. 
 
 6. 
 
 
 
 
 
 7. Galbi
 
 
 
 
 
 
 
 
 8. 
 
 
 
 
 
 
 
 9. 
 
 
 
 
 
 10 
 
 
 
 
 

Polish 

 
 
 
 
 
 
 
 
 
 
 

Portuguese

Russian 

 Шея/Sheya (neck)
 / (ribs)
 /, / (brisket)
 / (thick edge), / (rib eye), / (loin on the bone)
 / (thin edge), / (short filet)
 / (sirloin)
 Вырезка/ (tenderloin)
 / (shortloin)
 / (peritoneum), /
 / (shoulder)
 Oguzok (rump), bedro (hip)
 / (flank)
 / (leg)
 / (shank)

Turkish 

   neck, chuck (1)
   rib steak, ribeye (2)
   Steak, striploin (3)
   rump (4)
   fillet steak, tenderloin (5)
   round of beef, eye of round (7)
   front and rear leg (9, 14)
   flank (11)
   brisket, plate, short ribs (12)
  shoulder, shank (13)

UNECE standard for bovine meat carcasses and cuts

The UNECE standard formalizes internationally agreed upon specifications written in a consistent, detailed and accurate manner using anatomical names to identify cutting lines.

See also

 List of steak dishes
 Meat on the bone
 Steak

References

External links
Agence canadienne d'inspection des aliments - Boeuf - Manuel de coupes de viande
French-German butcher glossary